Bayston Hill is a civil parish in Shropshire, England.  The parish contains five listed buildings that are recorded in the National Heritage List for England.  All the listed buildings are designated at Grade II, the lowest of the three grades, which is applied to "buildings of national importance and special interest". The parish contains the large village of Bayston Hill, the smaller village of Pulley, and the surrounding countryside.  The listed buildings are consist of three farmhouses, and a farm building, all of which are timber framed, and a redundant church converted into a dwelling.


Buildings

References

Citations

Sources

Lists of buildings and structures in Shropshire